= Tsar Nicholas =

Tsar Nicholas may refer to:

- Nicholas I of Russia (1796–1855), Emperor of Russia from 1825 to 1855
- Nicholas II of Russia (1868–1918), last Emperor of Russia from 1894 until abdication in 1917. Also known as Orthodox Saint Nicholas the Passion Bearer
